Sérgio Pereira (born 16 May 1898, date of death unknown) was a Brazilian footballer. He played in four matches for the Brazil national football team in 1919. He was also part of Brazil's squad for the 1919 South American Championship.

References

External links
 
 

1898 births
Year of death missing
Brazilian footballers
Brazil international footballers
Place of birth missing
Association football midfielders